Wan Cheng (born 1 November 1985 in Tianjin) is a Chinese football player currently playing for Guangxi Pingguo Haliao in the China League Two.

Club career
Wan Cheng started his professional football career at Shandong Luneng after he joined them from Tianjin Locomotive's youth team. He made his senior league debut on October 27, 2002 in a league match between Shandong Luneng and Shanxi Guoli as a promising 16-year-old. Under Russian coach Valeri Nepomniachi he was a mainly used as substitute throughout the 2002 and 2003 league seasons to gradually establish himself within the team. However, he lost favor in the club when Serbian coach Ljubiša Tumbaković came in at the beginning of the 2004 league season and Wan Cheng saw his appearances drop to only two throughout the 2004 league season. Throughout 2005 to 2007 league seasons Wan Cheng would have spent most of his time in the reserves and would have to re-establish himself within the team, eventually returning into the senior team on April 27, 2008 in a league match against Dalian Shide.

On 25 February  2017, Wan transferred to League Two side Yinchuan Helanshan.

Career statistics 
Statistics accurate as of match played 31 December 2020.

Honours

Club
Shandong Luneng
Chinese Super League: 2006, 2008
Chinese FA Cup: 2004, 2006
Chinese Super League Cup: 2004

Tianjin Quanjian F.C.
China League One: 2016

References

External links
Player stats at Sohu.com
Player stats at football-lineups website
Shandong Luneng Club Profile at Asian Red Dragons website

1985 births
Living people
Chinese footballers
Footballers from Tianjin
Shandong Taishan F.C. players
Tianjin Tianhai F.C. players
Chinese Super League players
China League One players
Association football forwards
Association football midfielders
Guangxi Pingguo Haliao F.C. players